Lopholistriodon was an extinct genus of even-toed ungulates that existed during the Miocene in Africa.

It was among the earliest and smallest member of the Listriodontinae. One species, Lopholistriodon moruoroti, has been reassigned to the related Namachoerus.

References

Prehistoric Suidae
Miocene mammals of Africa
Miocene even-toed ungulates
Prehistoric even-toed ungulate genera